Nanume is a monotypic genus of  comb-footed spiders containing the single species, Nanume naneum. It was first described by Michael I. Saaristo in 2006, and is found on the Aldabra Atoll.

See also
 List of Theridiidae species

References

Monotypic Araneomorphae genera
Spiders of Africa
Theridiidae